Cannizzaro is a lunar impact crater that is located on the Moon's far side as seen from the Earth, just beyond the northwestern limb. It lies in a region of the surface that is sometimes brought into view due to the effects of libration, but not much detail can be seen since this feature is viewed from the side. The crater lies across the southwestern rim of the much larger-walled plain Poczobutt.

It is a worn crater with a rim that has been eroded by impacts. Several of these impacts form deep incisions in the side of the rim, forming indentations several kilometers across. The most prominent of these impacts is a relatively fresh small crater lying across the northeastern rim. The interior floor is nearly level, with a small central ridge offset just to the east of the midpoint. There are also numerous small craterlets across the floor.

References

 
 
 
 
 
 
 
 
 
 
 
 

Impact craters on the Moon